The Death and Return of Superman is a short film released in 2012 on YouTube, by Chronicle writer Max Landis. The film, as its title implies, is a monologue about "The Death and Return of Superman" storyline from DC Comics over parody-like sketches. The film was produced by Bryan Basham, creator of COPS: Skyrim.

Plot
While drinking Johnnie Walker mixed with water, Max Landis talks about Superman and how he influenced the world of comic book superheroes until his fading popularity in the 1990s. DC Comics executives concluded that for Superman to be relevant again, he had to die. Landis describes the birth of Doomsday and the events that set up his battles with Superman until the deaths of both combatants. DC Comics shipped three million copies of Superman vol. 2 #75 worldwide, nearly all of which sold out within the first day of release.

Following Superman's funeral, DC Comics published the "Reign of the Supermen!" story arc, which introduced four characters claiming to be Superman. One was Hank Henshaw, a cyborg version of Superman who defeated the other three and destroyed Coast City, causing Hal Jordan to lose his sense of reasoning and kill fellow members of the Green Lantern Corps. The Cyborg Superman continued his reign of terror until the real Superman appeared and defeated him. It was revealed that Superman had emerged from a "healing coma", identical to death except temporary. Superman's resurrection was met with outrage from fans who felt betrayed by DC Comics; sales of Superman's comics declined and have never recovered ever since.

As he pours himself another drink, Landis recalls a lesson learned from his father John Landis about how to kill a vampire. After the younger Landis lists ways mentioned in vampire literature like a stake through the heart and sunlight, his father explains that writers can kill vampires any way they want because vampires do not exist. In essence, the Death of Superman story arc did not kill Superman; instead, it made death irrelevant in comics, as hundreds of comic book characters would die and resurrect multiple times in the years to come.

Cast

Max Landis as himself
Kelsey Gunn as young Max Landis
Morgan Krantz as Superman 
Elden Henson as Doomsday
Mandy Moore as Lois Lane
Elijah Wood as Hank Henshaw / Cyborg Superman
Matt Bennett as Superboy
Dustin Romero as The Eradicator
Barry Brisco as Steel
Zach Cregger as Hal Jordan
Whitney Moore as Batman
Jennifer Newman as Robin
Jezlan Moyet as Nightwing and a Fraternity partygoer
Sarah Shahi as Titania
Brian Morrison as Guardian
Brad Gage as Guy Gardner
Ashley Hinshaw as Power Girl
Chloe Dykstra as Ice
Luke Barats as Blue Beetle
Joe Bereta as Booster Gold
Zena Grey as Lana Lang
Jimmi Simpson as Mad Scientist 
Chris Hardwick as himself
Kit Willesee as the '30s Woman
Yuri Lowenthal as the '30s Man
Taliesin Jaffe as a Fraternity partygoer
Matthew Mercer as a Fraternity partygoer
 Coy Jandreau as a member of the Green Lantern Corps
Jennette McCurdy as Eradicator Folks
Elizabeth Gillies as Eradicator Folks

Ron Howard makes a cameo appearance as Max's son, and Simon Pegg appears as John Landis; Landis had done this style of video before in his web series Cooking With Comics, as well as his videos Vague Recollections of Watchmen and Drunk Comic Book History: The Robins.

References

External links

2011 short films
2011 films
2011 comedy films
2012 YouTube videos
American superhero films
American comedy short films
Fan films based on Superman
Films directed by Max Landis
Films shot in Los Angeles
Films with screenplays by Max Landis
Superhero comedy films
2010s English-language films
2010s American films
Films released on YouTube